Liopeltis rappi is a species of snake in the family Colubridae. The species is endemic to South Asia.

Etymology
The specific name, rappi, is in honor of German naturalist Wilhelm Ludwig von Rapp.

Geographic range
L. rappi is found in Nepal and India (Darjeeling, Himachal Pradesh, Sikkim).

Taxonomy
Liopeltis rappi was originally described as a new species (Ablabes rappii ) by Günther in 1860, based on a single specimen which was "uniform blackish" dorsally. In the same scientific paper, Günther also described another new species (Ablabes owenii ), likewise based on a single specimen which was smaller and "greyish-brown" with a "black collar" and black crossbands anteriorly.  After more specimens had been added to the collection of the British Museum, including some which were intermediate in size and colouration, Boulenger determined that "owenii " was a juvenile specimen of Liopeltis rappii.

References

Further reading
Boulenger GA (1890). The Fauna of British India, Including Ceylon and Burma. Reptilia and Batrachia. London: Secretary of State for India in Council. (Taylor & Francis, printers). xviii + 541 pp. (Ablabes rappii, p. 307).
Günther A (1860). "Contributions to a Knowledge of the Reptiles of the Himalaya Mountains".  Proc. Zool. Soc. London 1860: 148–175. (Ablabes rappii, new species, pp. 154–155 + Plate XXVI, figures B, b; Ablabes owenii, new species, p. 155 + Plate XXVI, figures A, a).
Smith MA (1943). The Fauna of British India, Ceylon and Burma, Including the Whole of the Indo-Chinese Sub-region. Reptilia and Amphibia. Vol. III.—Serpentes. London: Secretary of State for India. (Taylor and Francis, printers). xii + 583 pp. (Liopeltis rappi, p. 186).
Stoliczka F (1870). "Observations of some Indian and Malayan Amphibia and Reptilia". Ann. Mag. Nat. Hist., Fourth Series 6: 105–109. (Ablabes rappii, p. 107).

Liopeltis
Reptiles described in 1860
Taxa named by Albert Günther
IUCN Red List data deficient species
Reptiles of India
Reptiles of Nepal